James Eugene "Gene" Broadwell (January 15, 1921, Atlanta, Georgia – June 22, 2018, Palo Alto, California) was an American aeronautical engineer, known for the Broadwell model (1964, Physics of Fluids). The model consists of a set of differential equations, describing the structure of a shock wave in a simple discrete velocity gas.

Biography
Broadwell graduated in 1942 from Georgia Institute of Technology (Georgia Tech) with a B.S. in mechanical engineering. He served from 1942 to 1946 in the United States Army Air Force. During his military service, he was stationed at Wright Field in Dayton, Ohio, except when he was sent for additional training to California Institute of Technology (Caltech), where he received in 1944 an M.S. in aeronautical engineering. During his service at Wright Field, he worked on the design and development of aircraft engines. In October 1943 in Dayton, he married Edith "Edie" Merriman (1923–2018). Their marriage took place a few days before he was posted to Caltech. In 1948, the couple with their first daughter moved to Ann Arbor, Michigan, where he enrolled as a graduate student at the University of Michigan. There in 1952 he received a Ph.D. in aeronautical engineering. From 1948 to 1959 he was at the University of Michigan, where he was eventually promoted to associate professor. During Gene and Edie Broadwell's years in Ann Arbor, she gave birth to two more daughters, had her own television show, acted in university plays, and was a troop leader for the Brownies and the Girl Scouts of the USA. The family left Michigan and moved to Palos Verdes in Los Angeles County, California. There Gene Broadwell worked for TRW for many years. He also worked with colleagues at Caltech and sometimes did research at Caltech and Stanford University.

In 1987 he was elected to the National Academy of Engineering for "contributions to the understanding and management of turbulent mixing with application to chemical laser design." In 2014 he was elected to the Georgia Tech Engineering Hall of Fame.

Gene and Edie Broadwell were married for 75 years. She died about a month before he died. Upon his death he was survived by three daughters, a grandson, and two great-granddaughters.

Selected publications
 
 
 
 
  (over 430 citations)

References

1921 births
2018 deaths
20th-century American engineers
21st-century American engineers
American aerospace engineers
Georgia Tech alumni
California Institute of Technology alumni
University of Michigan alumni
University of Michigan faculty
Members of the United States National Academy of Engineering
United States Army Air Forces personnel of World War II